San Francisco Ballet dances each year at the  War Memorial Opera House, San Francisco, and tours; this is the list of ballets with casts for the 2013 season beginning with the gala, Thursday, January 24, 2013,  The Nutcracker is danced the year before.

Gala

Thursday, January 24, 2013

notes for gala

Program one, January 29 – February 1 Mixed program
 Suite en Blanc
 In the Night
 Borderlands

Program two, February 13 – February 19  Full-Length
 Nijinsky (Danced by  Hamburg Ballet)

Program three, February 26 – March 10  Mixed program
 Beaux
 Guide to Strange Places
 Possokhov's The Rite of Spring

Program four, March 1 – March 9 Mixed program
 From Foreign Lands, an Alexei Ratmansky world premiere
 Within the Golden Hour
 Scotch Symphony

Program five, March 21 - March 28 Full length
 Onegin

Program six, April 9 - April 20 Mixed program
 Raymonda - Act III
 Ibsen's House
 Symphonic Dances

Program seven, April 11 - April 21 Mixed program
 Criss-Cross
 Francesca da Rimini
 Symphony in Three Movements

Program eight, May 3 - May 12 Full-length
 Cinderella, by Christopher Wheeldon

External links 
 

San Francisco Ballet
Lists of ballets by company
Ballet
2013 in San Francisco